The USENIX Annual Technical Conference (USENIX ATC, or, canonically, USENIX) is a conference of computing professions sponsored by the USENIX association. The conference includes computing tutorials, and a single track technical session for presenting refereed research papers, SIG meetings, and BoFs.

There have been several notable announcements and talks at USENIX.  In 1995, James Gosling announced "Oak", which was to become the Java Programming Language.  John Ousterhout first presented  TCL here, and Usenet was announced here.

It is considered one of the most prestigious operating systems venues and has an 'A' rating from the Australian Ranking of ICT Conferences (ERA).

List of conferences
 USENIX ATC 2018 — Boston, Massachusetts, July 11–13, 2018.
 USENIX ATC 2017 — Santa Clara, California, July 12–14, 2017.
 USENIX ATC 2016 — Denver, Colorado, June 22–24, 2016.
 USENIX ATC 2015 — Santa Clara, California, July 8–10, 2015.
 USENIX ATC 2014 — Philadelphia, Pennsylvania, June 19–20, 2014.
 USENIX ATC 2013 — San Jose, California, June 26–28, 2013.
 USENIX ATC 2012 — Boston, Massachusetts, June 13–15, 2012.
 USENIX ATC 2011 — Portland, Oregon, June 15–17, 2011.
 USENIX ATC 2010 — Boston, Massachusetts, June 23–25, 2010.
 USENIX ATC 2009 — San Diego, California, June 14–19, 2009.
 USENIX ATC 2008 — Boston, Massachusetts, June 22–June 27, 2008.
 USENIX ATC 2007 — Santa Clara, California, June 17–22, 2007.
 USENIX ATC 2006 — Boston, Massachusetts, May 30–June 3, 2006.
 USENIX ATC 2005 — Anaheim, California, April 10–15, 2005.
 USENIX ATC 2004 — Boston, Massachusetts, June 27–July 2, 2004.
 USENIX ATC 2003 — San Antonio, Texas, June 9–14, 2003.
 USENIX ATC 2002 — Monterey, California, June 10–15, 2002.
 USENIX ATC 2001 — Boston, Massachusetts, June 25–30, 2001.
 USENIX ATC 2000 — San Diego, California, June 18–23, 2000.
 USENIX ATC 1999 — Monterey, California, June 6–11, 1999.
 USENIX ATC 1998 — New Orleans, Louisiana, June 15–19, 1998.
 USENIX ATC 1997 — Anaheim, California, January 6–10, 1997.
 USENIX ATC 1996 — San Diego, California, January 22–26, 1996.
 USENIX TC 1995 — New Orleans, Louisiana, January 16–20, 1995.

Prior to 1995 there were two USENIX Technical Conferences held each year, with one held in the summer and the other during the winter.

References

External links
The USENIX Association
USENIX ATC Conferences

Computer conferences
Unix